The Maradugao River (also called Maridugao and Maridagao) is a river that serves as a natural boundary between the provinces of Bukidnon and Lanao del Sur in Mindanao in southern Philippines. It joins the Pulangi River in Cotabato.

Sources
The river headwaters originate from the Kalatungan Mountain Range and Mount Piapayungan eventually emptying at the Pulangi River.

Dam
The Malitubog-Maridagao Dam (also known as Mal-Mar Dam) is an irrigation project by the National Irrigation Administration.

References

Rivers of the Philippines
Landforms of Bukidnon
Landforms of Lanao del Sur